A plebiscite on a capital city was held on 11 December 1995 in the area of the Northwest Territories that was to be split off into the new territory of Nunavut. Voters were given the options of either Iqaluit or Rankin Inlet. Iqaluit was chosen by 60% of voters.

Voting system
The plebiscite was run under the Northwest Territories Plebiscite Act and overseen by Elections Northwest Territories. The plebiscite was non-binding, and the results were to be taken by the Government of Canada's Minister of Indian Affairs and Northern Development, Ron Irwin, to the federal Cabinet.

Results

See also
List of Northwest Territories plebiscites
List of Northwest Territories general elections

References

External links
Nunavut Capital plebiscite Special Report
Results of the Capital plebiscite

Referendums in the Northwest Territories 
Referendums in Nunavut
1995 referendums
Iqaluit
History of Nunavut 
1995 in Nunavut
December 1995 events in Canada